The boules competitions at the 2018 Mediterranean Games in Tarragona took place between 28 and 30 June at the Campclar Velodrome.

Athletes competed in 9 events across 3 disciplines: lyonnaise, pétanque and raffa.

Medal summary

Lyonnaise

Pétanque

Raffa

Medal table

References

External links
 2018 Mediterranean Games – Boules

Sports at the 2018 Mediterranean Games
2018
Mediterranean Games